Meca is a  parish of the municipality of Alenquer, in western Portugal. The population in 2011 was 1,719, in an area of 14.12 km².

References

Parishes of Alenquer, Portugal